Eric J. Rubin is an American microbiologist, infectious disease specialist, and is currently the editor-in-chief of the New England Journal of Medicine. He is also an adjunct professor of immunology and infectious diseases and was formerly the Irene Heinz Given Professor and chair of the department of immunology and infectious diseases at the Harvard T.H. Chan School of Public Health. His research laboratory works on Mycobacterium tuberculosis, nontuberculous mycobacteria (NTMs), and the development and application of bacterial genetics tools to study the fundamental biology of these pathogenic organisms. He holds an M.D. from the School of Medicine as well as a Ph.D. from the Graduate School of Biomedical Sciences at Tufts University.

References

Year of birth missing (living people)
Living people
Harvard University faculty
American immunologists
American Jews
Tufts University School of Medicine alumni
Members of the National Academy of Medicine
Medical journal editors